Mir Mohammad Rezaul Karim (1935 – 29 October 2005) was a Bangladeshi diplomat, philanthropist and writer.

Education and career
Karim earned his bachelor's in economics from the University of Dhaka, master's in public administration from Karachi University, another master's from the Fletcher School of Law and Diplomacy.

During the 1971 Liberation War, Karim was posted as the First Secretary in London at the Pakistan High Commission. He served as the Deputy High Commissioner and went to India in the late 1970s. He went on to serve as the ambassador to China, Iraq, Iran, Egypt and Russia, and high commissioner to Sri Lanka and the United Kingdom. He retired from the foreign service in 1992.

Personal life
Karim was married to Salma. Together they had three children, Jalal, Shahed and Seema, who went on to have his grandchildren Alisa, Shaida and Zeyd.

References

1935 births
2005 deaths
People from Kushtia District
The Fletcher School at Tufts University alumni
University of Dhaka alumni
University of Karachi alumni
Bangladeshi diplomats
Ambassadors of Bangladesh to China
Ambassadors of Bangladesh to Iran
Ambassadors of Bangladesh to Russia
High Commissioners of Bangladesh to Sri Lanka
High Commissioners of Bangladesh to the United Kingdom
Ambassadors of Bangladesh to Iraq
Ambassadors of Bangladesh to USSR